

The VTOL Aircraft Phillicopter is a 1970s Australian light utility helicopter designed and built by VTOL Aircraft of Newcastle West, New South Wales.

Design
Duan A. Phillips began work on design of a two-seat helicopter in 1962, and started to build a prototype in 1967. The prototype, the Phillicopter Mark I, was completed and first flew in 1971, powered by a single  Rolls-Royce Continental O-200 engine. Phillips set up VTOL Aircraft Pty Ltd in 1971 to construct and develop the Phillicopter. The Phillicopter was granted its Australian type certificate in 1984, and the prototype was modified to represent a pre-production standard.

The Phillicopter is a conventional two-seat helicopter with a two-blade rotor powered by a  Lycoming O-360 piston engine.  It has an enclosed cabin with removable doors and is fitted with dual controls. The open frame fuselage has a two-blade tail rotor at the rear. A 91-litre fuel tank is fitted and an optional 91-litre central tank can be fitted, although this can also be used for crop spraying chemicals rather than fuel. The Phillicopter has a fixed skid type landing gear.

Specifications

See also

References

Notes

Bibliography

External links
Flight 22 June 1985

1970s Australian civil utility aircraft
1970s Australian helicopters